Beddgeraint is a small village in the  community of Penbryn, Ceredigion, Wales, which is 69 miles (111.1 km) from Cardiff and 189.1 miles (304.4 km) from London. Beddgeraint is represented in the Senedd by Elin Jones (Plaid Cymru) and is part of the Ceredigion constituency in the House of Commons.

References

See also
List of localities in Wales by population

Villages in Ceredigion